Automorphic may refer to

Automorphic number, in mathematics
Automorphic form, in mathematics
 Automorphic representation, in mathematics
 Automorphic L-function, in mathematics
Automorphism, in mathematics
Rock microstructure#Crystal shapes